Xinjin District is a District of Chengdu, Sichuan Province, China. It borders the prefecture-level city of Meishan to the south.

Transport
Line 10 (Chengdu Metro)
Xinjin Airport

Climate

References

External links

Districts of Chengdu